Shefqet Pllana (1918–1994) was an Albanian ethnographer and scholar from Kosovo. He authored more than 140 articles in his lifetime and was specialized in Albanian folk music.

References

1918 births
1994 deaths
People from Ferizaj
Albanian folklorists
Albanian ethnographers
Yugoslav people of Albanian descent
Albanian scholars
Kosovo Albanians
Yugoslav ethnographers
Albanian male writers
20th-century Albanian scientists
20th-century Albanian writers